A mullion is a vertical element that forms a division between units of a window or screen, or is used decoratively. It is also often used as a division between double doors. When dividing adjacent window units its primary purpose is a rigid support to the glazing of the window. Its secondary purpose is to provide structural support to an arch or lintel above the window opening.  Horizontal elements separating the head of a door from a window above are called transoms.

History

Stone mullions were used in Armenian, Saxon and Islamic architecture prior to the 10th century.  They became a common and fashionable architectural feature across Europe in Romanesque architecture, with paired windows divided by a mullion, set beneath a single arch. The same structural form was used for open arcades as well as windows, and is found in galleries and cloisters.

In Gothic architecture, windows became larger and arrangements of multiple mullions and openings were used, both for structure and ornament. This is particularly the case in Gothic cathedrals and churches where stained glass was set in lead and ferramenta between the stone mullions. Mullioned windows of a simpler form continued to be used into the Renaissance and various Revival styles. Italian windows with a single mullion, dividing the window into two equal elements are said to be biforate, or to parallel the Italian bifore windows.

Design

Mullions may be made of any material, but wood and aluminium are most common, although glass is also used between windows. I. M. Pei used all-glass mullions in his design of JFK Airport's Terminal 6 (National Airlines Sundrome), unprecedented at the time.

Mullions are vertical elements and are often confused with transoms, which lie horizontally. In US parlance, the word is also confused with the "muntin" ("glazing bar" in the UK) which is the precise word for the very small strips of wood or metal that divide a sash into smaller glass "panes" or "lights".

A mullion acts as a structural member, in most applications the mullion transfers wind loads and weight of the glazing and upper levels into the structure below. In a curtain wall screen, however, the mullions only support the weight of the transoms, glass and any opening vents. Also in the case of a curtain wall screen the weight of glazing can be supported from above (providing the structure can take the required loads) this puts the mullions under tension rather than compression.

When a very large glazed area was desired before the middle of the nineteenth century, such as in the large windows seen in Gothic churches or Elizabethan palaces, the openings necessarily required division into a framework of mullions and transoms, often of stone. It was further necessary for each glazed panel, sash or casement to be further subdivided by muntins or lead cames because large panes of glass were reserved primarily for use as mirrors, being far too costly to use for glazing windows or doors.

In traditional designs today, mullions and transoms are normally used in combination with divided-light windows and doors when glazing porches or other large areas.

See also
 Bifora, a mullioned window
 Trumeau – for a door
 Mullion wall

Notes

References

Architectural elements
Windows